Walter Dickson may refer to:

Walter Dickson (author) (1916–1990), Swedish author
Walter Hamilton Dickson (1806–1885), lawyer and political figure in Canada West
Walter Michael Dickson (1884–1915), Scottish rugby player